The Apreece Baronetcy, of Washingley in the County of Huntingdon, was a title in the Baronetage of Great Britain. It was created on 12 July 1782 for Thomas Apreece. The title became extinct on the death of the second Baronet in 1842.

Apreece baronets, of Washingley (1782)
Sir Thomas Hussey Apreece, 1st Baronet (1744–1833)
Shuckburgh Ashby Apreece (1773–1807) married the future Lady Jane Davy
Sir Thomas George Apreece, 2nd Baronet (1791–1842)

References

External links 

Extinct baronetcies in the Baronetage of Great Britain